The Americas Zone was the unique zone within Group 3 of the regional Davis Cup competition in 2018. The zone's competition was held in round robin format in Escazú, Costa Rica, from 28 May to 2 June 2018. The two winning nations won promotion to Group II, Americas Zone, for 2019.

Participating nations

Inactive nations

Draw
Date: 28 May–2 June

Location: Costa Rica Country Club, Escazú, Costa Rica (hard)

Format: Round-robin basis. The winner of Pool A will play-off against the runner-up of Pool B and the winner of Pool B will play-off against the runner-up of Pool A to determine which two nations will advance to Americas Zone Group II in 2019.

Seeding

 1Davis Cup Rankings as of 9 April 2018

Round Robin

Pool A

Pool B 

Standings are determined by: 1. number of wins; 2. number of matches; 3. in two-team ties, head-to-head records; 4. in three-team ties, (a) percentage of sets won (head-to-head records if two teams remain tied), then (b) percentage of games won (head-to-head records if two teams remain tied), then (c) Davis Cup rankings.

Playoffs 

Round Robin

Pool A

Paraguay vs. Panama

Costa Rica vs. Cuba

Paraguay vs. Cuba

Costa Rica vs. Panama

Paraguay vs. Costa Rica

Cuba vs. Panama

Pool B

Honduras vs. Bahamas

Bermuda vs. Antigua and Barbuda

Jamaica vs. Bermuda

Bahamas vs. Antigua and Barbuda

Honduras vs. Bermuda

Jamaica vs. Antigua and Barbuda

Honduras vs. Antigua and Barbuda

Jamaica vs. Bahamas

Honduras vs. Jamaica

Bahamas vs. Bermuda

Playoffs

Promotional Playoffs

Paraguay vs. Honduras

Bahamas vs. Costa Rica

5th to 6th Playoff

Cuba vs. Jamaica

7th to 8th Playoff

Panama vs. Antigua and Barbuda

References

External links

Official Website

Americas Zone Group III
Davis Cup Americas Zone